The 2016–17 Lebanese FA Cup was the 45th edition of the national football cup competition of Lebanon. It started with the First Round on 17 September 2016 and concluded with the final on 7 May 2017.

Defending champions Nejmeh lost to Safa in the semi-finals. Ansar went on to win their 14th title, qualifying for the 2018 AFC Cup group stage.

First round

Second round

Round of 16

Quarter-finals

Semi-finals

Final

References

Lebanese FA Cup seasons
FA Cup